Alexander Robertson Mercer was a Scottish amateur footballer who played as a right half in the Scottish League for Queen's Park.

Personal life 
Mercer served as a lance corporal in the Lovat Scouts during the First World War.

Career statistics

References 

Scottish footballers
Queen's Park F.C. players
Year of death missing
Scottish Football League players
Association football wing halves
Footballers from Stirling
1892 births
British Army personnel of World War I
Lovat Scouts soldiers